Roger Charles Louis Guillemin (born January 11, 1924) is a French-American neuroscientist. He received the National Medal of Science in 1976, and the Nobel prize for medicine in 1977 for his work on neurohormones, sharing the prize that year with Andrew Schally and Rosalyn Sussman Yalow.

Biography
Completing his undergraduate work at the University of Burgundy, Guillemin received his M.D. degree from the Medical Faculty at Lyon in 1949, and went to Montreal, Quebec, Canada, to work with Hans Selye at the Institute of Experimental Medicine and Surgery at the Université de Montréal where he received a Ph.D. in 1953. The same year he moved to the United States to join the faculty at Baylor College of Medicine at Houston. In 1965, he became a naturalized citizen of the United States. In 1970 he helped to set up the Salk Institute in La Jolla, California where he worked for neuroendocrinology until retirement in 1989.

Guillemin and Andrew V. Schally discovered the structures of TRH and GnRH in separate laboratories. The process of this scientific discovery at Guillemin's laboratory is the subject of a study by Bruno Latour and Steve Woolgar, published as Laboratory Life.

Guillemin signed along with other Nobel Prize winners a petition requesting a delegation of the Committee on the Rights of the Children of the United Nations to visit a Tibetan child who is under house arrest in China since 1995, namely Gendhun Choekyi Nyima, recognized as the 11th Panchen Lama by the 14th Dalai Lama, Tenzin Gyatso.

Awards and honors
 National Academy of Sciences, 1974
 Gairdner Foundation International Award, 1974
 Albert Lasker Award for Basic Medical Research, 1975
 Dickson Prize in Medicine, 1976
 Passano Award in Medical Sciences, 1976
 National Medal of Science, 1976
 American Academy of Arts and Sciences, 1977
 Nobel Prize in Physiology or Medicine, 1977

References

Further reading

External links

 
 Salk Institute faculty page

1924 births
Members of the United States National Academy of Sciences
Living people
Physicians from Dijon
Nobel laureates in Physiology or Medicine
French Nobel laureates
American endocrinologists
French emigrants to the United States
National Medal of Science laureates
Commandeurs of the Légion d'honneur
French neuroscientists
Université de Montréal alumni
Members of the French Academy of Sciences
Members of the Serbian Academy of Sciences and Arts
Baylor College of Medicine physicians and researchers
Recipients of the Albert Lasker Award for Basic Medical Research
University of Burgundy alumni
Fellows of the American Academy of Arts and Sciences
People with acquired American citizenship
Salk Institute for Biological Studies people